Ricardo Jérez may refer to:

Ricardo Jérez (footballer, born 1956) (born 1956), Guatemalan footballer
Ricardo Jérez Jr. (born 1986), Guatemalan footballer